The NWA Mid-America Heavyweight Championship is a professional wrestling title defended in the US states of Tennessee and Alabama. The title began in 1957 and lasted first until 1980 when it was first abandoned when Jerry Jarrett took over the Mid-American titles from Nick Gulas. Jarrett revived it in 1981, making it a part of the Memphis-based Continental Wrestling Association, and it then lasted until 1987 when it was unified with the newly created CWA (now renamed Championship Wrestling Association) Heavyweight Championship.

Title history

Footnotes

See also

National Wrestling Alliance
Continental Wrestling Association

References

External links
Wrestling Supercards and Tournaments
NWA Main Event official website

National Wrestling Alliance championships
Continental Wrestling Association championships
Heavyweight wrestling championships
NWA Mid-America championships
United States regional professional wrestling championships